The canton of Meung-sur-Loire is an administrative division of the Loiret department, central France. Its borders were modified at the French canton reorganisation which came into effect in March 2015. Its seat is in Meung-sur-Loire.

It consists of the following communes:
 
Artenay
Le Bardon
Boulay-les-Barres
Bricy
Bucy-le-Roi
Bucy-Saint-Liphard
Cercottes
Chaingy
La Chapelle-Onzerain
Charsonville
Chevilly
Coinces
Coulmiers
Épieds-en-Beauce
Gémigny
Gidy
Huêtre
Huisseau-sur-Mauves
Lion-en-Beauce
Meung-sur-Loire
Patay
Rouvray-Sainte-Croix
Rozières-en-Beauce
Ruan
Saint-Ay
Saint-Péravy-la-Colombe
Saint-Sigismond
Sougy
Tournoisis
Trinay
Villamblain
Villeneuve-sur-Conie

References

Cantons of Loiret